Albu Bandar (also Romanized as Albū Bandar) is a village in Buzi Rural District, in the Central District of Shadegan County, Khuzestan Province, Iran. At the 2006 census, its population was 394, in 79 families.

References 

Populated places in Shadegan County